Triplax is a genus of pleasing fungus beetles in the family Erotylidae. There are about 18 described species in Triplax.

Species
 Triplax alachuae Boyle, 1956
 Triplax californica LeConte, 1854
 Triplax cuneata Boyle, 1954
 Triplax dissimulator (Crotch, 1873)
 Triplax errans Boyle, 1956
 Triplax festiva Lacordaire, 1842
 Triplax flavicollis Lacordaire, 1842
 Triplax frontalis Horn, 1862 (black-headed pleasing fungus beetle)
 Triplax frosti Casey, 1924
 Triplax lacensis Boyle, 1954
 Triplax macra LeConte, 1854
 Triplax marcescens Boyle, 1954
 Triplax mesosternalis Schaeffer, 1905
 Triplax microgaster Boyle, 1954
 Triplax puncticeps Casey, 1916
 Triplax thompsoni Boyle, 1962
 Triplax thoracica Say, 1825
 Triplax wehrlei Boyle, 1954

References

Further reading

 
 
 

Erotylidae